KTV is an Indian pay television channel owned by Sun TV Network its broadcasting Tamil-language films. It was launched on 22 October 2001.

History 
The letter K in KTV stands for Kondattam which means celebration. It was launched on 22 October 2001 by Kalanidhi Maran, the Chairman of Sun TV Network. At the time of launch, Sun TV Network's library had over 5,000 movies. Its HD counterpart was launched on 11 December 2011. At Every Friday and Saturday, KTV Channel premiered more new and blockbuster movies which was telecast by Sun TV till now.

Former programming 
 All In All Alamelu

References

External links 
 Official Website 
 Sun TV Network
 Sun Group

Tamil-language television channels
Movie channels in India
Television channels and stations established in 2001
Television stations in Chennai